This is a list of the mammal species recorded in Sardinia, Italy. Almost all terrestrial mammals found on the island today have been introduced by humans, replacing a highly endemic fauna present on the island during the Late Pleistocene

The following tags are used to highlight each species' conservation status as assessed by the International Union for Conservation of Nature.

Order: Rodentia (rodents) 

Rodents make up the largest order of mammals, with over 40% of mammalian species. They have two incisors in the upper and lower jaw which grow continually and must be kept short by gnawing.
Suborder: Sciuromorpha
Family: Gliridae (dormice)
Subfamily: Glirinae
Genus: Glis
 Edible dormouse, G. glis  introduced
Subfamily: Leithiinae
Genus: Eliomys
 Garden dormouse, E. quercinus  introduced
Family: Muridae (mice and rats)
Subfamily: Murinae
Genus: Apodemus
 Wood mouse, A. sylvaticus 
Genus: Mus
House mouse, M. musculus  introduced
Genus: Rattus
Brown rat, R. norvegicus  introduced
Black rat, R. rattus  introduced

Order: Lagomorpha (lagomorphs) 
The lagomorphs comprise two families, Leporidae and pikas. Though they can resemble rodents, and were classified as a superfamily in that order until the early 20th century, they have since been considered a separate order. They differ from rodents in a number of physical characteristics, such as having four incisors in the upper jaw rather than two.
Family: Leporidae (rabbits, hares)
Genus: Lepus
European hare, L. europaeus  introduced
Cape hare, L. capensis   introduced

Order: Eulipotyphla 

The order Erinaceomorpha contains a single family, Erinaceidae, which comprise the hedgehogs and gymnures. The hedgehogs are easily recognised by their spines while gymnures look more like large rats.
Family: Erinaceidae (hedgehogs)
Subfamily: Erinaceinae
Genus: Erinaceus
West European hedgehog, E. europaeus  introduced

Family: Soricidae (shrews)
Subfamily: Crocidurinae
Genus: Crocidura
 North African white-toothed shrew, Crocidura ichnusae  introduced
Genus: Suncus
 Etruscan shrew, Suncus etruscus

Order: Chiroptera (bats) 
The bats' most distinguishing feature is that their forelimbs are developed as wings, making them the only mammals capable of flight. Bat species account for about 20% of all mammals.
Family: Miniopteridae (long-winged bats)
Subfamily: Miniopterinae
Genus: Miniopterus
Common bent-wing bat, M. schreibersii 
Family: Molossidae (free-tailed bats)
Subfamily: Molossinae
Genus: Tadarida
European free-tailed bat, T. teniotis 
Family: Rhinolophidae (horseshoe bats) 
Subfamily: Rhinolophinae
Genus: Rhinolophus
Mediterranean horseshoe bat, R. euryale 
Greater horseshoe bat, R. ferrumequinum 
Lesser horseshoe bat, R. hipposideros 
Mehely's horseshoe bat, R. mehelyi 
Family: Vespertilionidae (mouse-eared bats)
Subfamily: Myotinae
Genus: Myotis
 Long-fingered bat, Myotis capaccinii 
 Daubenton's bat, Myotis daubentonii 
 Geoffroy's bat, Myotis emarginatus 
 Felten's myotis, Myotis punicus 
Subfamily: Verpertilioninae
Genus: Barbastella
 Barbastelle, Barbastella barbastellus 
Genus: Hypsugo
 Savi's pipistrelle, Hypsugo savii 
Genus: Plecotus
 Brown long-eared bat, Plecotus auritus 
 Grey long-eared bat, Plecotus austriacus 
 Sardinian long-eared bat, Plecotus sardus 
Genus: Pipistrellus
 Kuhl's pipistrelle, Pipistrellus kuhlii 
 Nathusius's pipistrelle, Pipistrellus nathusii 
 Common pipistrelle, Pipistrellus pipistrellus

Order: Cetacea (whales) 
The order Cetacea includes whales, dolphins and porpoises. They are the mammals most fully adapted to aquatic life with a spindle-shaped nearly hairless body, protected by a thick layer of blubber, and forelimbs and tail modified to provide propulsion underwater.

Suborder: Mysticeti
Family: Balaenopteridae (rorquals)
Genus: Balaenoptera
 Common minke whale, Balaenoptera acutorostrata 
 Fin whale, Balaenoptera physalus 
Suborder: Odontoceti
Family: Delphinidae (dolphins and pilot whales)
Genus: Delphinus
 Short-beaked common dolphin, Delphinus delphis 
Genus: Tursiops
 Common bottlenose dolphin, Tursiops truncatus 
Genus: Stenella
 Striped dolphin, Stenella coeruleoalba 
Genus: Steno
 Rough-toothed dolphin, Steno bredanensis 
Genus: Grampus
 Risso's dolphin, Grampus griseus 
Genus: Globicephala
 Long-finned pilot whale, Globicephala melas 
Genus: Orcinus
 Killer whale, Orcinus orca 
Family: Physeteridae (sperm whales)
Genus: Physeter
 Sperm whale, Physeter macrocephalus 
Family: Ziphiidae (beaked whales)
Genus: Ziphius
 Cuvier's beaked whale, Ziphius cavirostris

Order: Carnivora (carnivorans) 

There are over 260 species of carnivorans, the majority of which feed primarily on meat. They have a characteristic skull shape and dentition.
Suborder: Caniformia
Family: Canidae (dogs, foxes, wolves)
Genus: Vulpes
 Red fox, V. vulpes  introduced
Family: Mustelidae (weasels)
Genus: Martes
European pine marten, M. martes  introduced
Genus: Mustela
Least weasel, M. nivalis  introduced
Family: Phocidae (earless seals)
Genus: Monachus
Mediterranean monk seal, M. monachus  possibly extirpated

Order: Artiodactyla (even-toed ungulates) 

The even-toed ungulates are ungulates whose weight is borne about equally by the third and fourth toes, rather than mostly or entirely by the third as in perissodactyls. There are about 220 artiodactyl species, including many that are of great economic importance to humans.
Family: Suidae (pigs)
Subfamily: Suinae
Genus: Sus
Wild boar, S. scrofa  introduced
Family: Cervidae (deer)
Subfamily: Cervinae
Genus: Cervus
 Red deer, C. elaphus 
Corsican red deer, C. e. corsicanus introduced
Genus: Dama
 Fallow deer, D. dama  introduced

Extinct mammals

Order: Proboscidea (elephants and kin) 

 Family: Elephantidae
 Genus: Mammuthus (mammoths)
 Species: Mammuthus lamarmorai

Order: Rodentia (rodents) 
Suborder: Sciuromorpha
Family: Muridae (mice and rats)
Subfamily: Murinae
Genus Rhagamys
Tyrrhenian field rat, R. orthodon 
Familly: Cricetidae
Subfamily: Arvicolinae
Genus: Microtus
Tyrrhenian vole, M. henseli

Order: Lagomorpha (lagomorphs) 
Family: Ochotonidae (pikas)
Genus: Prolagus
Sardinian pika, P. sardus

Order: Eulipotyphla 
Family: Soricidae (shrews)
Subfamily: Soricinae
Genus: Asoriculus
Asoriculus similis 
Family: Talpidae (moles)
Genus: Talpa
Tyrrhenian mole, T. tyrrhenica

Order: Carnivora (carnivorans) 
Family: Canidae (dogs, foxes, wolves)
Genus Cynotherium
Sardinian dhole, C. sardous 
Family: Mustelidae
Subfamily: Galictinae
Genus: Enhydrictis
Enhydrictis galictoides 
Subfamily:Lutrinae (otters)
Genus: Sardolutra
Genus: Algarolutra
Genus: Megalenhydris

Order: Artiodactyla (even-toed ungulates) 
Family: Cervidae (deer)
Subfamily: Cervinae
Genus: Praemegaceros
Praemegaceros cazioti  Extinct after 5700 BC

See also 
 List of chordate orders
 Lists of mammals by region
 List of prehistoric mammals
 Mammal classification
 List of mammals described in the 2000s

References

Further reading 
 Aulagnier, S. et al. (2008). Guide des mammifères d'Europe, d'Afrique du Nord et de Moyen-Orient. Delachaux et Niestlé, Paris
 Shirihai, H. & Jarrett, B. (2006). Whales, Dolphins and Seals: A Field Guide to the Marine Mammals of the World. A & C Black, London

Mammals
Sardinia